The Howell-Garner-Monfee House is a historic house at 300 West Fourth Street in North Little Rock, Arkansas.  It is a -story brick structure, with a wide gable roof pierced by gabled dormers.  A single-story porch wraps around the east and north sides, with brick posts and a dentil course in the eave.  The main entrance is flanked by pilasters and sidelights, with a distinctive transom window that has semi-circular sections joined by a straight section.  Built in 1906, it is one of the best-preserved examples of housing built in the city's most fashionable neighborhood of that period.

The house was listed on the National Register of Historic Places in 1978.

See also
National Register of Historic Places listings in Pulaski County, Arkansas

References

Houses on the National Register of Historic Places in Arkansas
Houses completed in 1906
Houses in North Little Rock, Arkansas
National Register of Historic Places in Pulaski County, Arkansas
1906 establishments in Arkansas